Doi Phu Nang National Park is a national park in Dok Khamtai, Pong and Chiang Muan Districts, Phayao Province, Thailand.

Description
The national park, with an area of 537,424 rai ~  is located in two mountain chains of the Phi Pan Nam Range, Mae Yom and Nampi, with a not-protected area in between. There are both mixed evergreen forests, dipterocarp forest and dry deciduous forests in the park area.

Doi Phu Nang, the mountain that gives its name to the park, with an altitude of 1,202 m, is the highest peak in the area. The sources of two tributaries of the Yom River are in this mountain. The park also has scenic rock formations and two impressive waterfalls, Namtok Than Sawan and Namtok Huai Ton Phueng.

Flora and fauna

Trees in the protected area include Malabar ironwood, Afzelia xylocarpa, Lagerstroemia calyculata, Mangifera caloneura, Ailanthus triphysa, Michelia alba, Berrya ammonilla, Schleichera oleosa, Vitex pinnata and Pterocarpus macrocarpus.

A variety of birds are found, especially the rare green peafowls, threatened by habitat destruction, which come to the park area for breeding from January to March. Among the other animals, the fishing cat, Asiatic black bear, muntjac, masked palm civet, bamboo rat, tree shrews, the Asiatic softshell turtle and the Bengal monitor deserve mention.

See also
List of national parks of Thailand
List of Protected Areas Regional Offices of Thailand

References

External links
Trekthailand - Doi Phu Nang National Park
Doi Phu Nang National Park - Thai Forest Booking

Geography of Phayao province
National parks of Thailand
Protected areas established in 1991
Tourist attractions in Phayao province
1991 establishments in Thailand
Phi Pan Nam Range